Barlow River may refer to:

 Barlow River (New Zealand), a tributary of the Perth River in the Westland district of the South Island of New Zealand
 Barlow River (Chibougamau River), a tributary of the Chibougamau River in Quebec, Canada